Michael David Fried  is an American mathematician working in the geometry and arithmetic of families of nonsingular projective curve covers.

Career

Fried received his undergraduate degree from Michigan State University in electrical engineering and then worked for three years as an aerospace electrical engineer. He then received his PhD from University of Michigan in Mathematics in 1967 under Donald John Lewis.

He spent two years as a postdoctoral researcher at the Institute for Advanced Study (1967–1969). He was a professor at Stony Brook University (8 years), University of California at Irvine (26 years), University of Florida (3 years)  and Hebrew University (2 years). He has held visiting appointments at MIT, MSRI, University of Michigan, University of Florida, Hebrew University and Tel Aviv University.

He has been an editor on several mathematics journals including the Research Announcements of the Bulletin of the American Mathematical Society, and the Journal of Finite Fields and its Applications.

Awards

He was included in the inaugural (2013) class of Fellows of the American Mathematical Society. He was also a Sloan Fellow (1972–1974), Lady Davis Fellow at Hebrew University (1987–1988), Fulbright scholar at Helsinki University (1982–1983), and Alexander von Humboldt Research Fellow  (1994–1996).

See also
Field arithmetic

References

External links

 Michael Fried's Home Page

Living people
20th-century American mathematicians
21st-century American mathematicians
Algebraists
Algebraic geometers
Number theorists
Fellows of the American Mathematical Society
Horace H. Rackham School of Graduate Studies alumni
Sloan Research Fellows
Year of birth missing (living people)